Gold Coast University Hospital (abbreviated GCUH or GCH, and sometimes Gold Coast Uni Hospital) is a major teaching hospital is offering tertiary level district general hospital in the Gold Coast, Australia, completed in September 2013. The hospital was built on the Greenfields site adjacent to Griffith University Gold Coast campus at a cost of $1.8 billion.

History 
Construction commenced on 16 December 2008 when Queensland Premier Anna Bligh turned the first sod. The land was previously occupied by a church, a section of the Southport Lawn Cemetery, and undeveloped acreage. Bovis Lend Lease built the hospital.

The university hospital incorporated new specialist services including cardiac surgery, neurosciences, trauma and neonatal intensive care; these were not available at the previous Gold Coast Hospital. The main nine-level-high building is topped with a helicopter landing site.

On 27 September 2013, Queensland Health officially shut down services at the Gold Coast Hospital, and transferred the remaining patients from the old Gold Coast Hospital to the new Gold Coast University Hospital.

Location 

The hospital is located on 1 Hospital Boulevard, off Parklands Drive, Southport, adjacent to Olsen Ave. A multi story car park is provided for patients and visitors and is located across the road from the main hospital building. The Gold Coast University Hospital is co-located with Griffith University and new Gold Coast Private Hospital, forming the Gold Coast's 'Health and Knowledge Precinct'.

Public transport 

The hospital precinct is served by trams and buses. The G:link light rail system runs from Helensvale railway station to Broadbeach South via the Southport CBD and Surfers Paradise. The Gold Coast University Hospital station is located near the hospital's main entrance, beneath the GCUH bus station.

Facility services

Hospital services 

 Anaesthesia
 Emergency medicine
 Intensive care
 General medicine
 Cardiology
 Nephrology and renal dialysis
 Rehabilitation
 Geriatrics
 Oncology
 Endocrinology
 Paediatrics
 Pharmacy
 General surgery
 Urology
 Ophthalmology
 Orthopedic surgery
 Neurosurgery
 Vascular surgery
 Oral and maxillofacial surgery
 Plastic surgery
 Paediatric surgery
 Gynaecology
 Cardiothoracic surgery
 Palliative care
 Obstetrics
 Psychiatry

Hospital buildings 
 Block A and D — Clinical administration and clinical services buildings: Intensive care, surgical theatres, rehabilitation gymnasium, renal dialysis, and offices
 Blocks B and C – Inpatient units (wards): Connected to main clinical services building; Block B has north and south wings, and Block C has east and west wings
 Block F – Mental health: Inpatient units and clinical offices
 Block E – Pathology and education: Pathology laboratories, lecture theatre, tutorial rooms, and hospital library
 Block M – Engineering Workshops
 Block P – Central Energy Plant

Training 
The Gold Coast University Hospital is the primary teaching hospital for medical students (student doctors) of Griffith University's and Bond University's medical schools. And like most Australian public state hospitals, it is an accredited site for further postgraduate residency training of medical practitioners.

It is also one of the hospitals which participates in the Queensland Anaesthetic Rotational Training Scheme for training anaesthetists.

In media
The hospital is featured in the Seven Network factual television series Gold Coast Medical.

See also

 List of hospitals in Australia

References

External links 

 Gold Coast University Hospital
 Translink

Hospital buildings completed in 2013
Hospitals in Queensland
Buildings and structures on the Gold Coast, Queensland
Hospitals established in 2013
2013 establishments in Australia
Southport, Queensland